Ercüment is a Turkish given name for males. People named Ercüment include:

 Ercüment Aslan, Turkish boxer
 Ercument Kalmik, Turkish painter
 Ercüment Olgundeniz, Turkish athlete
 Ercüment Sunter, Turkish former national basketballer

Another name of Ercüment would be Ercument.

Turkish masculine given names